Tito José da Costa Santos, known as Tito (born 8 February 1946) is a former Portuguese football player.

He played 11 seasons and 292 games in the Primeira Liga for Vitória de Guimarães, Atlético CP, União de Tomar and Famalicão.

Club career
He made his Primeira Liga debut for Atlético CP on 18 September 1966 in a game against Académica de Coimbra. In 1979, he signed with Toronto Blizzard in the North American Soccer League. He was released by Toronto in early 1979, and later played in the National Soccer League with Toronto First Portuguese. In his debut season with First Portuguese he contributed a goal in the finals match against Toronto Panhellenic which secured the NSL Cup. He returned to Portugal to play with Coelima.

References

1946 births
Footballers from Lisbon
Living people
Portuguese footballers
Association football forwards
Atlético Clube de Portugal players
Primeira Liga players
U.F.C.I. Tomar players
Vitória S.C. players
F.C. Famalicão players
C.D. Feirense players
Portuguese expatriate footballers
Expatriate soccer players in Canada
Portuguese expatriate sportspeople in Canada
Canadian National Soccer League players
Toronto First Portuguese players